Little Company of Mary Hospital may refer to:

Little Company of Mary Hospital (San Pedro), San Pedro, California
Little Company of Mary Hospital (Torrance), Torrance, California
Little Company of Mary Hospital (Evergreen Park), Evergreen Park, Illinois
Life Groenkloof Hospital, formerly Little Company of Mary Hospital, Pretoria, South Africa